The Jakarta Raya Military Regional Command (abbreviated ) is the military district of the Indonesian Army which oversees the Greater Jakarta area. It is tasked for territorial army duties, specifically for defense to the capital city region of Indonesia.

History
On 1 September 1945, the People's Security Bureau (Badan Keamanan Rakyat/BKR) was founded in Jakarta, and was led by Lt. Col. Mufraeni Mukmin. BKR and Indonesian youth in API, Kris Hisbulah, and other paramilitary organisations confronted the allied forces. To increase armed resistance against the allied forces, the government of the Republic of Indonesia founded the People's Security Forces (Tentara Keamanan Rakyat/TKR) on 5 October 1945. One regiment of TKR in Jakarta was organised under the command of Lt.Col. Mufraini Mukmin.

On 24 September 1949, the Dutch government recognised Indonesia's Independence, one of the first actions of which was the signing of documents for the transfer of power in Jakarta Raya area from Comando Batavia En Ommelanden of the Dutch to Basis Comando Jakarta Raya of Indonesia, under supervision of Komisi Tiga Negara (KTN). This established 24 September as the anniversary day of Kodam Jaya. In December 1949, some units such as "Kala Hitam" Battalion and "Siluman" Battalion were dispatched to reinforce Basis Comando Jakarta Raya, following which Lt.Col. R. Taswin Natadiningrat was appointed as commander of Basis Comando Jakarta Raya.

In January 1950, Basis Comando Jakarta Raya change its name to Komando Militer Pangkalan Jakarta Raya (KMP Jakarta Raya). Then, in accordance with instruction from Army HQ on 10 May 1950, Komando Militer Kota (KMK) was changed to Komando Militer Kota Besar Jakarta Raya ( KMKB-DR). As the Republic of Indonesia continued to develops, the Army Chief of Staff released two letters of command numbered SP 1671/10/1959 and SP 1672/10/1959 (both dated 24 December 1959), which reorganized the Army command for the capital, thus the 5th Regional Military Command/Jayakarta (Komando Daerah Militer V/Jayakarta, also known as the Jakarta Military Region, MRC 5/Jaya,   Kodam V/Jaya or Region V/Jayakarta) was founded in the basis of the KMKB-DR which a new commander was to be named for this separate command for the region. After that, on 19 January 1960, at 9:00 am in Lapangan Banteng, the Chief of Staff of the Army, Lt. Gen. Abdul Haris Nasution, appointed Col.(inf) Umar Wirahadikusumah as the first Commander of Kodam V/Jaya.

The 1st Mechanized Infantry Brigade (back then known as the 1st Infantry Brigade) took part in the events of the 30 September Movement, its commander being one of the coup attempt leaders. Col. Wirahadikusumah was spared from any action due to pressure from then Maj Gen Suharto, then commander of Kostrad, for him to prevent having to join the rebel forces in his area of operations. In 1984, the command simply became Kodam Jaya as part of an armed forces-wide reorganization, its numerical designation removed.

The name "Jayakarta" comes from the old and original name of the city of Jakarta before the arrival of the Dutch. It is a Sanskrit derived name consisting of two words which are "Jaya" meaning "victorious" and "Karta" meaning "achieved", literally translated to "achieved through victory" which was the historical background of the foundation of the city when the Army of Fatahillah successfully defeated and drove the Portuguese forces out of Jakarta in the 16th century.

Territorial units
The Territorial Units under Kodam Jaya consists of two Military Area Commands (Korem) units and one self-supporting Military District Command (Kodim BS).
 051 Military Area Command/Wijayakarta, located in Bekasi
 0504 Military District Command - South Jakarta
 0505 Military District Command - East Jakarta
 0507 Military District Command - Bekasi
 0508 Military District Command - Depok
 0509 Military District Command - Bekasi regency
 052 Military Area Command/Wijayakrama, in Tangerang
 0502 Military District Command - North Jakarta
 0503 Military District Command - West Jakarta
 0506 Military District Command - Tangerang
 0510 Military District Command - Tigaraksa 
 0501 Military District Command (self supporting unit), located in Central Jakarta

Combat Units

Kodam Jaya also oversees several Army combat and combat support units:
 1st Mechanized Infantry Brigade/Jayasakti
 201st Mechanized Infantry Battalion/Jaya Yudha
 202nd Mechanized Infantry Battalion/Tajimalela
 203rd Mechanized Infantry Battalion/Arya Kemuning
 1st Cavalry Brigade/Limpung Alugoro
 7th Cavalry Battalion/Pragosa Satya (equipped with wheeled V-150 and it's variants)
 9th Cavalry Battalion/Satya Dharma Kala (equipped with Scorpion 90 tanks & it's variants)
 1st Air Defence Artillery Regiment/Falatehan
 6th Medium Air Defence Artillery Battalion
 10th Medium Air Defence Artillery Battalion
 003 Air Defence Artillery Detachment (Missile)
 11th Combat Engineers Battalion/Durdhaga Wighra
 7th Field Artillery Battalion/Biring Galih
 3rd Combat Engineers Detachment/Agni Tirta Dharma

Training units
Training units under Kodam Jaya are organised into the Kodam Jaya Training Regiment (Resimen Induk Kodam Jaya or "Rindam Jaya"). The units are:
 Satuan Dodik Latpur (Combat Training Command Unit)
 Satuan Dodik Kejuruan (Specialized Training Command Unit)
 Sekolah Calon Bintara (Non-Commissioned Officer Training School)
 Sekolah Calon Tamtama (Enlisted Training School)
 Satuan Dodik Bela Negara (National Defence Training Command Unit) - defence auxiliary components training centre

Supporting units
 Kodam Jaya Capital Military Police Command (Pomdam Jaya)
 Kodam Jaya Capital Public Affairs and Press Office (Pendam Jaya)
 Kodam Jaya Office of the Adjutant General (Anjendam Jaya)
 Kodam Jaya Military Physical Fitness and Sports Office (Jasdam Jaya)
 Kodam Jaya Medical Department (Kesdam Jaya)
 Kodam Jaya Veterans and National Reserves Administration (Babiminvetcadam Jaya)
 Kodam Jaya Topography Service (Topdam Jaya)
 Kodam Jaya Chaplaincy Corps (Bintaldam Jaya)
 Kodam Jaya Finance Office (Kudam Jaya)
 Kodam Jaya Legal Affairs Office (Kumdam Jaya)
 Kodam Jaya HQ and HQ Services Detachment (Detasemen Jaya)
 Kodam Jaya Information and Communications Technology Office (Infolahtadam Jaya)
 Kodam Jaya Logistics and Transportation Division (Bekangdam Jaya)
 Kodam Jaya Signals Corps (Hubdam Jaya)
 Kodam Jaya Ordnance Department (Paldam Jaya)
 Kodam Jaya Engineers Command (Zidam Jaya)
 Kodam Jaya Cyber Operations Unit (Sandidam Jaya)
 Kodam Jaya Intelligence Command (Deninteldam Jaya)

References

External links
 Official website of the Jakarta Regional Military Command

Military regional commands of Indonesia
Organizations based in Jakarta
Indonesian Army
Military units and formations established in 1949